Norwood is a rapidly gentrifying suburb of Johannesburg, South Africa. It is located in Region E of the City of Johannesburg Metropolitan Municipality. It borders the suburbs of Orange Grove and Houghton. It is a garden suburb, with many of its homes dating back to the 1920s and 1930s. It is also one of the more popular dining spots in the city, renowned for its "celebrated restaurants"  and ethnic mix of cuisine, mainly based on Grant Avenue. Other suburbs with a similar atmosphere, popular for their streetlife and dining include Melville, Newtown, Parkhurst and Greenside. The suburb has a "distinctive cosmopolitan atmosphere" , and the residents comprise a mix of cultures including Jewish, Muslim, and West African. Norwood Primary School is based in the suburb. Some of its more well-known inhabitants include the anti-apartheid activist Helen Joseph (35 Fanny Avenue) and the actor Patrick Mynhardt (90 Henrietta Road).

References

External links
The best restaurant neighbourhoods, joburg.org.za
Gauteng Destinations: Norwood, Johannesburg, sa-venues.com

Johannesburg Region E